The Washington State Growth Management Act (GMA) is a Washington state law that requires state and local governments to manage Washington's growth by identifying and protecting critical areas and natural resource lands, designating urban growth areas, preparing comprehensive plans and implementing them through capital investments and development regulations. This approach to growth management is unique among states. The act (Chapter 36.70A RCW) was adopted by the Legislature in 1990.

The GMA was adopted because the Washington State Legislature found that uncoordinated and unplanned growth posed a threat to the environment, sustainable economic development and the quality of life in Washington.

Rather than centralize planning and decision-making at the state level, the GMA focuses on local control.  The GMA establishes state goals, sets deadlines for compliance, offers direction on how to prepare local comprehensive plans and regulations and sets forth requirements for early and continuous public participation. Within the framework provided by the mandates of the Act, local governments have many choices regarding the specific content of comprehensive plans and implementing development regulations.

The Growth Management Hearings Board hears and determines allegations that a government agency has not complied with the GMA or the related Shoreline Management Act (SMA, Chapter 90.58 RCW).  A 1991 law amended the GMA to create three regional boards, but a 2010 law consolidated them into one. SMA jurisdiction was added in 1996.  The board's administrative rules of practice and procedure are found in the Washington Administrative Code (Title 242-02 WAC). Hearings Board members are appointed by the governor to staggered three year terms.

References

External links
 MRSC: Growth Management and Comprehensive Planning in Washington
 Growth Management Act Laws and Rules
 Washington State Legislature Planning
RIDGE Records. 1923–2015. 9.31 cubic feet (9 boxes). At the Labor Archives of Washington, University of Washington Libraries Special Collections.
http://www.futurewise.org/growth-management-act#:~:text=%20Key%20Growth%20Management%20Act%20Provisions%20%201,and%20cities%20fully%20planning%20under%20the...%20More%20

Washington (state) law
1990 in law
1990 in Washington (state)